Samory Uiki Bandeira Fraga (born 29 November 1996) is a Brazilian long jumper who competed at the 2020 Summer Olympics.

Personal life
From Porto Alegre, Brazil, Fraga studied international relations at Kent State University on an athletic scholarship.

Career
Fraga was selected as part of the Brazil team for the 2020 Summer Games long jump competition.

Personal bests
Outdoor
Long Jump: 8.23 (wind: +1.3 m/s) –  Bragança Paulista, 24 Apr 2021

Indoor
Long Jump: 7.87 –  Belgrade, 18 Mar 2022

International competitions

References

External links
 Kent State Golden Flashes bio

1996 births
Living people
Brazilian male long jumpers
Olympic athletes of Brazil
Athletes (track and field) at the 2020 Summer Olympics
Kent State Golden Flashes men's track and field athletes
Sportspeople from Porto Alegre
21st-century Brazilian people